ChromeOS, sometimes styled as chromeOS and formerly styled as Chrome OS, is a Linux-based operating system developed and designed by Google. It is derived from the open-source ChromiumOS and uses the Google Chrome web browser as its principal user interface.

Google announced the project in July 2009, initially describing it as an operating system where applications and user data would reside in the cloud. ChromeOS was used primarily to run web applications. 

All ChromiumOS and ChromeOS versions support progressive web applications (such as Google Docs or Microsoft Office 365), as well as web browser extensions (which can resemble native applications). ChromeOS (but not ChromiumOS) from 2016 onwards can also run Android applications from Google Play. Since 2018, ChromiumOS/ChromeOS version 69 onwards also support Linux applications, which are executed in a lightweight virtual machine with a Debian Linux environment.

The operating system is now usually evaluated in conjunction with the hardware that runs it.

History
To ascertain marketing requirements, developers relied on informal metrics, including monitoring the usage patterns of some 200 machines used by Google employees. Developers also noted their own usage patterns.

ChromeOS was initially intended for secondary devices like netbooks, and not as a user's primary PC. Google has requested that its hardware partners use solid-state drives "for performance and reliability reasons" as well as the lower capacity requirements inherent in an operating system that accesses applications and most user data on remote servers. In November 2009, Matthew Papakipos, engineering director for the ChromeOS, announced that ChromeOS would only support solid-state storage (i.e. not mechanical hard-disks), and noted that ChromeOS only required one-sixtieth as much drive space as Windows 7. Ten years later, in 2019, the recovery images Google provided for ChromeOS were still only between 1 and 3 GB in size.

On November 19, 2009, Google released ChromeOS's source code as the ChromiumOS project. At a November 19, 2009 news conference, Sundar Pichai–at the time Google's vice president overseeing Chrome–demonstrated an early version of the operating system. He previewed a desktop which looked very similar to the desktop Chrome browser, and in addition to the regular browser tabs also had application tabs, which take less space and can be pinned for easier access. At the conference, the operating system booted up in seven seconds, a time Google said it would work to reduce. Additionally, Chris Kenyon, vice president of OEM services at Canonical Ltd, announced that Canonical was under contract to contribute engineering resources to the project with the intent to build on existing open-source components and tools where feasible.

Canonical was an early engineering partner on the project, and initially ChromiumOS could only be built on an Ubuntu system. In February 2010, the ChromiumOS development team switched to Gentoo Linux because Gentoo's package management system Portage was more flexible. The ChromiumOS build environment is no longer restricted to any particular distribution, but installation and quick-start guides use Debian's (and thus also Ubuntu's) apt syntax.

Early Chromebooks (2010) 
In 2010, Google released the unbranded Cr-48 Chromebook in a pilot program. The launch date for retail hardware featuring ChromeOS was delayed from late 2010 until the next year. 

On May 11, 2011, Google announced two Chromebooks from Acer and Samsung at Google I/O. The Samsung model was released on June 15, 2011, and the Acer model in mid-July. In August 2011, Netflix announced official support for ChromeOS through its streaming service, allowing Chromebooks to watch streaming movies and TV shows via Netflix. At the time, other devices had to use Microsoft Silverlight to play videos from Netflix. Later in that same month, Citrix released a client application for ChromeOS, allowing Chromebooks to access Windows applications and desktops remotely. Dublin City University became the first educational institution in Europe to provide Chromebooks for its students when it announced an agreement with Google in September 2011.

Expansion (2012) 

By 2012, demand for Chromebooks had begun to grow, and Google announced a new range of devices, designed and manufactured by Samsung. In so doing, they also released the first Chromebox, the Samsung Series 3, which was ChromeOS' entrance into the world of desktop computers. Although they were faster than the previous range of devices, they were still underpowered compared to other desktops and laptops of the time, fitting in more closely with the Netbook market. Only months later, in October, Samsung and Google released a new Chromebook at a significantly lower price point ($250, compared to the previous Series 5 Chromebooks' $450). It was the first Chromebook to use an ARM processor, one from Samsung's Exynos line. To reduce the price, Google and Samsung also reduced the memory and screen resolution of the device. An advantage of using the ARM processor, however, was that the Chromebook didn't require a fan. Acer followed quickly after with the C7 Chromebook, priced even lower ($199), but containing an Intel Celeron processor. One notable way Acer reduced the cost of the C7 was to use a laptop hard disk rather than a solid-state drive.

In April 2012, Google made the first update to ChromeOS's user interface since the operating system had launched, introducing a hardware-accelerated window manager called "Aura" along with a conventional taskbar. The additions marked a departure from the operating system's original concept of a single browser with tabs and gave ChromeOS the look and feel of a more conventional desktop operating system. "In a way, this almost feels as if Google is admitting defeat here", wrote Frederic Lardinois on TechCrunch. He argued that Google had traded its original version of simplicity for greater functionality. "That's not necessarily a bad thing, though, and may just help ChromeOS gain more mainstream acceptance as new users will surely find it to be a more familiar experience." Lenovo and HP followed Samsung and Acer in manufacturing Chromebooks in early 2013 with their own models. Lenovo specifically targeted their Chromebook at students, headlining their press release with "Lenovo Introduces Rugged ThinkPad Chromebook for Schools".

When Google released Google Drive, they also included Drive integration in ChromeOS version 20, released in July 2012. While ChromeOS had supported Flash since 2010, by the end of 2012 it had been fully sandboxed, preventing issues with Flash from affecting other parts of ChromeOS. This affected all versions of Chrome including ChromeOS.

Chromebook Pixel (2013) 

Until 2013, Google had never made their own ChromeOS device. Instead, ChromeOS devices were much more similar to their Nexus line of Android phones, with each ChromeOS device being designed, manufactured, and marketed by third-party manufacturers, but with Google controlling the software. However, in February 2013 this changed when Google released the Chromebook Pixel. The Chromebook Pixel was totally different from previous devices. Not only was it entirely Google-branded, but it contained an Intel i5 processor, a high-resolution (2,560 × 1,700) touchscreen display, and came at a price more competitive with business laptops.

2013 to present 
By the end of 2013, analysts were undecided on the future of ChromeOS. Although there had been articles predicting the demise of ChromeOS since 2009, ChromeOS device sales continued to increase substantially year-over-year. In mid-2014, Time magazine published an article titled "Depending on Who's Counting, Chromebooks are Either an Enormous Hit or Totally Irrelevant", which detailed the differences in opinion. This uncertainty was further spurred by Intel's announcement of Intel-based Chromebooks, Chromeboxes, and an all-in-one offering from LG called the Chromebase.

Seizing the opportunity created by the end of life for Windows XP, Google pushed hard to sell Chromebooks to businesses, offering significant discounts in early 2014.

ChromeOS devices outsold Apple Macs worldwide for the year 2020.

Since July 2021, ChromeOS's embedded controller was changed to be based on a Google maintained fork of Zephyr, a real time operating system.

Pwnium competition 
In March 2014, Google hosted a hacking contest aimed at computer security experts called "Pwnium". Similar to the Pwn2Own contest, they invited hackers from around the world to find exploits in ChromeOS, with prizes available for attacks. Two exploits were demonstrated there, and a third was demonstrated at that year's Pwn2Own competition. Google patched the issues within a week.

Material Design and app runtime for Chrome 
Although the Google Native Client has been available on ChromeOS since 2010, there originally were few Native Client apps available, and most ChromeOS apps were still web apps. However, in June 2014, Google announced at Google I/O that ChromeOS would both synchronise with Android phones to share notifications and begin to run Android apps, installed directly from Google Play. This, along with the broadening selection of Chromebooks, laid the groundwork for future ChromeOS development.

At the same time, Google was also moving towards the then-new Material Design design language for its products, which it would bring to its web products as well as Android Lollipop. One of the first Material Design items to come to ChromeOS was a new default wallpaper, though Google did release some screenshots of a Material Design experiment for ChromeOS that never made it into the stable version.

Features

Functionality for small and medium businesses and Enterprise

Chrome Enterprise 
Chrome Enterprise, launched in 2017, includes ChromeOS, Chrome Browser, Chrome devices and their management capabilities intended for business use. Businesses can access the standard ChromeOS features and unlock advanced features for business with the Chrome Enterprise Upgrade. Standard features include the ability to sync bookmarks and browser extensions across devices, cloud or native printing, multi-layered security, remote desktop, and automatic updates. Advanced features include Active Directory integration, unified endpoint management, advanced security protection, access to device policies and Google Admin console, guest access, kiosk mode, and whitelisting or blacklisting third-party apps managed on Google Play.
 
The education sector was an early adopter of Chromebooks, ChromeOS, and cloud-based computing. Chromebooks are widely used in classrooms and the advantages of cloud-based systems have been gaining an increased share of the market in other sectors as well, including financial services, healthcare, and retail. "The popularity of cloud computing and cloud-based services highlights the degree to which companies and business processes have become both internet-enabled and dependent." IT managers cite a number of advantages of the cloud that have motivated the move. Among them are advanced security, because data is not physically on a single machine that can be lost or stolen. Deploying and managing cloud-native devices is easier because no hardware and software upgrades or virus definition updates are needed and patching of OS and software updates are simpler. Simplified and centralized management decreases operational costs. 
 
Employees can securely access files and work on any machine, increasing the shareability of Chrome devices. Google's Grab and Go program with Chrome Enterprise allows businesses deploying Chromebooks to provide employees access to a bank of fully charged computers that can be checked out and returned after some time.

From Chromebooks to Chromebox and Chromebase 
In an early attempt to expand its enterprise offerings, Google released Chromebox for Meetings in February 2014. Chromebox for Meetings is a kit for conference rooms containing a Chromebox, a camera, a unit containing both a noise-cancelling microphone and speakers, and a remote control. It supports Google Hangouts meetings, Vidyo video conferences, and conference calls from UberConference.

Several partners announced Chromebox for Meetings models with Google, and in 2016 Google announced an all-in-one Chromebase for Meetings for smaller meeting rooms. Google targeted the consumer hardware market with the release of the Chromebook in 2011 and Chromebook Pixel in 2013, and sought access to the enterprise market with the 2017 release of the Pixelbook. The second-generation Pixelbook was released in 2019. In 2021 there are several vendors selling all-in-one Chromebase devices.

Enterprise response to Chrome devices 
Google has partnered on Chrome devices with several leading OEMs, including Acer, ASUS, Dell, HP, Lenovo, and Samsung. In August 2019, Dell announced that two of its popular business-focused laptops would run ChromeOS and come with Chrome Enterprise Upgrade. The Latitude 5300 2-in-1 Chromebook Enterprise and Latitude 5400 Chromebook Enterprise were the result of a two-year partnership between Dell and Google. The machines come with a bundle of Dell's cloud-based support services that would enable enterprise IT managers to deploy them in environments that also rely on Windows. The new laptop line "delivers the search giant's ChromeOS operating system in a form tailored for security-conscious organizations." Other OEMs that have launched devices with Chrome Enterprise Upgrade include Acer and HP. 
 
With a broader range of hardware available, ChromeOS became an option for enterprises wishing to avoid a migration to Windows 10 before Windows 7 support was discontinued by Microsoft.

Hardware 

Laptops running ChromeOS are known collectively as "Chromebooks". The first was the CR-48, a reference hardware design that Google gave to testers and reviewers beginning in December 2010. Retail machines followed in May 2011. A year later, in May 2012, a desktop design marketed as a "Chromebox" was released by Samsung. In March 2015 a partnership with AOPEN was announced and the first commercial Chromebox was developed.

In early 2014, LG Electronics introduced the first device belonging to the new all-in-one form factor called "Chromebase". Chromebase devices are essentially Chromebox hardware inside a monitor with a built-in camera, microphone and speakers.

The Chromebit is an HDMI dongle running ChromeOS. When placed in an HDMI slot on a television set or computer monitor, the device turns that display into a personal computer. The first device, announced in March 2015 was an Asus unit that shipped that November and which reached end of life in November 2020.

Chromebook tablets were introduced in March 2018 by Acer with their Chromebook Tab 10. Designed to rival the Apple iPad, it had an identical screen size and resolution and other similar specifications, a notable addition was a Wacom-branded stylus that doesn’t require a battery or charging.

ChromeOS supports multi-monitor setups, on devices with a video-out port, USB 3.0 or USB-C, the latter being preferable.

On February 16, 2022, Google announced a development version of ChromeOS Flex—a distribution of ChromeOS that can be installed on conventional PC hardware to replace other operating systems such as Windows and macOS. It is similar to CloudReady, a distribution of ChromiumOS whose developers were acquired by Google in 2020.

Software 
The software and updates are limited in their support lifetime. Each device model manufactured to run ChromeOS has a different end-of-life date, with all new devices released in 2020 and beyond guaranteed to receive a minimum of eight years from their date of initial release.

As of Version 78, the device's end-of-life date for software updates is listed in "About ChromeOS"-"Additional Details".

Applications 
Initially, ChromeOS was a pure thin client operating system that relied primarily on servers to host web applications and related data storage. Google gradually began encouraging developers to create "packaged applications", and later, Chrome Apps by employing HTML5, CSS, Adobe Shockwave, and JavaScript to provide a user experience closer to a native application.

In September 2014, Google launched App Runtime for Chrome (beta), which allowed certain ported Android applications to run on ChromeOS. Runtime was launched with four Android applications: Duolingo, Evernote, Sight Words, and Vine. In 2016, Google made Google Play available for ChromeOS, making most Android apps available for supported ChromeOS devices.

In 2018, Google announced plans for ChromeOS support for desktop Linux applications. This capability was released to the stable channel (as an option for most machines) with Chrome 69 in October 2018, but was still marked as beta. This feature was officially released with Chrome 91.

Chrome Apps 

From 2013 until January 2020, Google encouraged developers to build not just conventional Web applications for ChromeOS, but Chrome Apps (formerly known as Packaged Apps). In January 2020, Google's Chrome team announced its intent to phase out support for Chrome Apps in favor of "progressive web applications" (PWA) and Chrome extensions instead. In March 2020, Google stopped accepting new public Chrome Apps for the web store. According to Google, general support for Chrome Apps on ChromeOS will remain enabled, without requiring any policy setting, through June 2022.

From a user's perspective, Chrome Apps resemble conventional native applications: they can be launched outside of the Chrome browser, are offline by default, can manage multiple windows, and interact with other applications.

Integrated media player, file manager 
Google integrated a media player into both ChromeOS and the Chrome browser, enabling users to play back MP3s, view JPEGs, and handle other multimedia files without connectivity. The integration also supports DRM videos.

ChromeOS also includes an integrated file manager, resembling those found on other operating systems, with the ability to display directories and the files they contain from both Google Drive and local storage, as well as to preview and manage file contents using a variety of Web applications, including Google Docs and Box. Since January 2015, ChromeOS can also integrate additional storage sources into the file manager, relying on installed extensions that use the File System Provider API.

Remote application access and virtual desktop access 
In June 2010, Google's software engineer Gary Kačmarčík wrote that ChromeOS would access remote applications through a technology unofficially called "Chromoting", which would resemble Microsoft's Remote Desktop Connection. The name has since been changed to "Chrome Remote Desktop", and is like "running an application via Remote Desktop Services or by first connecting to a host machine by using RDP or VNC". Initial roll-outs of ChromeOS laptops (Chromebooks) indicate an interest in enabling users to access virtual desktops.

Android applications 
At Google I/O 2014, a proof of concept showing Android applications, including Flipboard, running on ChromeOS was presented. In September 2014, Google introduced a beta version of the App Runtime for Chrome (ARC), which allows selected Android applications to be used on ChromeOS, using a Native Client-based environment that provides the platforms necessary to run Android software. Android applications do not require any modifications to run on ChromeOS, but may be modified to better support a mouse and keyboard environment. At its introduction, ChromeOS support was only available for selected Android applications.

In 2016, Google introduced the ability to run Android apps on supported ChromeOS devices, with access to Google Play in its entirety. The previous Native Client-based solution was dropped in favor of a container containing Android's frameworks and dependencies (initially based on Android Marshmallow), which allows Android apps to have direct access to the ChromeOS platform, and allow the OS to interact with Android contracts such as sharing. Engineering director Zelidrag Hornung explained that ARC had been scrapped due to its limitations, including its incompatibility with the Android Native Development Toolkit (NDK), and that it was unable to pass Google's own compatibility test suite.

Linux apps 
All Chromebooks made since 2018, and many earlier models, can run Linux apps. As with Android apps, these apps can be installed and launched alongside other apps. Google maintains a list of devices that were launched before 2019, which support Linux apps.

Since 2013, it has been possible to run Linux applications in ChromeOS through the use of Crouton, a third-party set of scripts that allows access to a Linux distribution such as Ubuntu. However, in 2018 Google announced that desktop Linux apps were officially coming to ChromeOS. The main benefit claimed by Google of their official Linux application support is that it can run without enabling developer mode, keeping many of the security features of ChromeOS. It was noticed in the ChromiumOS source code in early 2018. Early parts of Crostini were made available for the Google Pixelbook via the dev channel in February 2018 as part of ChromeOS version 66, and it was enabled by default via the beta channel for testing on a variety of Chromebooks in August 2018 with version 69.

Architecture 
Google's project for supporting Linux applications in ChromeOS is called Crostini, named for the Italian bread-based starter, and as a pun on Crouton. Crostini runs a virtual machine through a virtual machine monitor called crosvm, which uses Linux's built-in KVM virtualization tool. Although crosvm supports multiple virtual machines, the one used for running Linux apps, Termina, contains a basic ChromeOS kernel based on Gentoo and userland utilities, in which it runs containers based on LXD.

Architecture 
ChromeOS is built on top of the Linux kernel. Originally based on Ubuntu, its base was changed to Gentoo Linux in February 2010. For Project Crostini, as of ChromeOS 80, Debian 10 (Buster) is the default container base image. In preliminary design documents for the ChromiumOS open-source project, Google described a three-tier architecture: firmware, browser and window manager, and system-level software and userland services.

 The firmware contributes to fast boot time by not probing for hardware, such as floppy disk drives, that are no longer common on computers, especially netbooks. The firmware also contributes to security by verifying each step in the boot process and incorporating system recovery.
 System-level software includes the Linux kernel that has been patched to improve boot performance. Userland software has been trimmed to essentials, with management by Upstart, which can launch services in parallel, re-spawn crashed jobs, and defer services in the interest of faster booting.
 The window manager handles user interaction with multiple client windows (much like other X window managers).

Security 
In March 2010, Google software security engineer Will Drewry discussed ChromeOS security. Drewry described ChromeOS as a "hardened" operating system featuring auto-updating and sandbox features that would reduce malware exposure. He said that ChromeOS netbooks would be shipped with Trusted Platform Module (TPM), and include both a "trusted boot path" and a physical switch under the battery compartment that activates a "developer mode". That mode drops some specialized security functions but increases developer flexibility. Drewry also emphasized that the open-source nature of the operating system would contribute greatly to its security by allowing constant developer feedback.

At a December 2010 press conference, Google declared that ChromeOS would be the most secure consumer operating system due in part to a verified boot ability, in which the initial boot code, stored in read-only memory, checks for system compromises. In the following nine years, ChromeOS has been affected by 55 documented security flaws of any severity, compared with over 1,100 affecting Microsoft Windows 10 in the five years to the end of 2019 and over 2,200 affecting Apple OS X in 20 years.

Shell access 
ChromeOS includes the Chrome Shell, or "crosh", which documents minimal functionality such as ping at crosh start-up.

In developer mode, a full-featured bash shell (which is supposed to be used for development purposes) can be opened via VT-2, and is also accessible using the crosh command shell. To access full privileges in shell (e.g. sudo) a root password is requested. For some time the default was "chronos" in ChromeOS and "facepunch" in ChromeOS Vanilla and later the default was empty, and instructions on updating it were displayed at each login.

Open source 
ChromeOS is partially developed under the open-source ChromiumOS project. As with other open-source projects, developers can modify the code from ChromiumOS and build their own versions, whereas ChromeOS code is only supported by Google and its partners and only runs on hardware designed for the purpose. Unlike ChromiumOS, ChromeOS is automatically updated to the latest version.

ChromeOS on Windows 
On Windows 8, exceptions allow the default desktop web browser to offer a variant that can run inside its full-screen "Metro" shell and access features such as the Share charm, without necessarily needing to be written with Windows Runtime. Chrome's "Windows 8 mode" was previously a tablet-optimized version of the standard Chrome interface. In October 2013, the mode was changed on Developer channel to offer a variant of the ChromeOS desktop.

Design 
Early in the project, Google provided publicly many details of ChromeOS' design goals and direction, although the company has not followed up with a technical description of the completed operating system.

User interface 
Design goals for ChromeOS' user interface included using minimal screen space by combining applications and standard Web pages into a single tab strip, rather than separating the two. Designers considered a reduced window management scheme that would operate only in full-screen mode. Secondary tasks would be handled with "panels": floating windows that dock to the bottom of the screen for tasks like chat and music players. Split screens were also under consideration for viewing two pieces of content side by side. ChromeOS would follow the Chrome browser's practice of leveraging HTML5's offline modes, background processing, and notifications. Designers proposed using search and pinned tabs as a way to quickly locate and access applications.

Version 19 window manager and graphics engine 
On April 10, 2012, a new build of ChromeOS offered a choice between the original full-screen window interface and overlapping, re-sizable windows, such as found on Microsoft Windows and Apple's macOS. The feature was implemented through the Ash window manager, which runs atop the Aura hardware-accelerated graphics engine. The April 2012 upgrade also included the ability to display smaller, overlapping browser windows, each with its own translucent tabs, browser tabs that can be "torn" and dragged to new positions or merged with another tab strip, and a mouse-enabled shortcut list across the bottom of the screen. One icon on the task bar shows a list of installed applications and bookmarks. Writing in CNET, Stephen Shankland argued that with overlapping windows, "Google is anchoring itself into the past" as both iOS and Microsoft's Metro interface are largely or entirely full-screen. Even so, "ChromeOS already is different enough that it's best to preserve any familiarity that can be preserved".

Printing 
Google Cloud Print is a Google service that helps any application on any device to print on supported printers. While the cloud provides virtually any connected device with information access, the task of "developing and maintaining print subsystems for every combination of hardware and operating system—from desktops to netbooks to mobile devices—simply isn't feasible." The cloud service requires installation of a piece of software called proxy, as part of the ChromeOS. The proxy registers the printer with the service, manages the print jobs, provides the printer driver functionality, and gives status alerts for each job.

In 2016, Google included "Native CUPS Support" in ChromeOS as an experimental feature that may eventually become an official feature. With CUPS support turned on, it becomes possible to use most USB printers even if they do not support Google Cloud Print.

Google announced that Google Cloud Print would no longer be supported after December 31, 2020, and that the online service would not be available as of January 1, 2021.

Link handling 
ChromeOS was designed to store user documents and files on remote servers. Both ChromeOS and the Chrome browser may introduce difficulties to end-users when handling specific file types offline; for example, when opening an image or document residing on a local storage device, it may be unclear whether and which specific Web application should be automatically opened for viewing, or the handling should be performed by a traditional application acting as a preview utility. Matthew Papakipos, ChromeOS engineering director, noted in 2010 that Windows developers have faced the same fundamental problem: "Quicktime is fighting with Windows Media Player, which is fighting with Chrome."

Release channels and updates 
ChromeOS uses the same release system as Google Chrome: there are three distinct channels: Stable, Beta, and Developer preview (called the "Dev" channel). The stable channel is updated with features and fixes that have been thoroughly tested in the Beta channel, and the Beta channel is updated approximately once a month with stable and complete features from the Developer channel. New ideas get tested in the Developer channel, which can be very unstable at times. A fourth canary channel was confirmed to exist by Google Developer Francois Beaufort and hacker Kenny Strawn, by entering the ChromeOS shell in developer mode, typing the command  to access the bash shell, and finally entering the command . It is possible to return to the verified boot mode after entering the canary channel, but the channel updater disappears and the only way to return to another channel is using the "powerwash" factory reset.

Reception 
At its debut, ChromeOS was viewed as a competitor to Microsoft, both directly to Microsoft Windows and indirectly the company's word processing and spreadsheet applications—the latter through ChromeOS' reliance on cloud computing. But ChromeOS engineering director Matthew Papakipos argued that the two operating systems would not fully overlap in functionality because ChromeOS is intended for netbooks, which lack the computational power to run a resource-intensive program like Adobe Photoshop.

Some observers claimed that other operating systems already filled the niche that ChromeOS was aiming for, with the added advantage of supporting native applications in addition to a browser. Tony Bradley of PC World wrote in November 2009:  
In 2016, Chromebooks were the most popular computer in the US K–12 education market.

By 2017, the Chrome browser had risen to become the number one browser used worldwide.

In 2020, Chromebooks became the second most-popular end-user oriented OS (growing from 6.4% in 2019 to 10.8% in 2020). The majority of growth came at Windows' expense (which fell from 85.4% in 2019 to 80.5% in 2021).

Relationship to Android 
Google's offering of two open-source operating systems, Android and ChromeOS, has drawn some criticism despite the similarity between this situation and that of Apple Inc.'s two operating systems, macOS and iOS. Steve Ballmer, Microsoft CEO at the time, accused Google of not being able to make up its mind. Steven Levy wrote that "the dissonance between the two systems was apparent" at Google I/O 2011. The event featured a daily press conference in which each team leader, Android's Andy Rubin and Chrome's Sundar Pichai, "unconvincingly tried to explain why the systems weren't competitive". Google co-founder Sergey Brin addressed the question by saying that owning two promising operating systems was "a problem that most companies would love to face". Brin suggested that the two operating systems "will likely converge over time". The speculation over convergence increased in March 2013 when ChromeOS chief Pichai replaced Rubin as the senior vice president in charge of Android, thereby putting Pichai in charge of both.

The relationship between Android and ChromeOS became closer at Google I/O 2014, where developers demonstrated native Android software running on ChromeOS through a Native Client-based runtime. In September 2014, Google introduced a beta version of the App Runtime for Chrome (ARC), which allows selected Android applications to be used on ChromeOS, using a Native Client-based environment that provides the platforms necessary to run Android software. Android applications do not require any modifications to run on ChromeOS, but may be modified to better support a mouse and keyboard environment. At its introduction, ChromeOS support was only available for selected Android applications. In October 2015, The Wall Street Journal reported that ChromeOS would be folded into Android so that a single OS would result by 2017. The resulting OS would be Android, but it would be expanded to run on laptops. Google responded that while the company has "been working on ways to bring together the best of both operating systems, there's no plan to phase out ChromeOS".

In 2016, Google introduced the ability to run Android apps on supported ChromeOS devices, with access to Google Play in its entirety. The previous Native Client-based solution was dropped in favor of a container containing Android's frameworks and dependencies (initially based on Android Marshmallow), which allows Android apps to have direct access to the ChromeOS platform, and allow the OS to interact with Android contracts such as sharing. Engineering director Zelidrag Hornung explained that ARC had been scrapped due to its limitations, including its incompatibility with the Android Native Development Toolkit (NDK), and that it was unable to pass Google's own compatibility test suite.

See also 

 Comparison of operating systems
 Google Fuchsia
 List of operating systems
  for information on typing diacritics (accents) and special symbols
 Timeline of operating systems

Notes

References

External links 

 Official website
 Official blog
 Release blog
 ChromiumOS project page
 
 Official announcement
 Google Chrome OS Live Webcast; November 19, 2009
 Chrome OS Flex

2011 software
ARM operating systems
Computer-related introductions in 2011
 
Google operating systems
Google
Mobile operating systems
Tablet operating systems
Operating systems based on the Linux kernel
Linux distributions without systemd
X86 operating systems
Proprietary operating systems
Linux distributions
Gentoo Linux derivatives
Rolling Release Linux distributions